Bijrani is a town in the Almora district in the Indian state of Uttarakhand. Nearby towns include Masi (18 km), Dwarahat (27 km) and Gairsain (35 km).

History
Mahadev Temple is dedicated to the Hindu God Shiva, and is situated around 0.5 kilometers from Bijrani.

Economy 
This is also an agricultural and forest valley, where rice, wheat and mangoes are grown.

Locality
More than 10 villages are in this area . Rampur is a center villages such as Bijrani, Kunigad Rewari, Kulgadhera, Tatalgaon, Bhanotia, sungadi, Jamnia, and others.

Demographics 
The community is mainly Hindu (Mushni Rawat, Negi, Mehra ... etc. ).

References 

Almora district
Uttarakhand